Scytalidopepsin A (Scytalidium aspartic proteinase A, Scytalidium lignicolum aspartic proteinase, Scytalidium lignicolum aspartic proteinase A-2, Scytalidium lignicolum aspartic proteinase A-I, Scytalidium lignicolum aspartic proteinase C, Scytalidium lignicolum carboxyl proteinase, Scytalidium lignicolum acid proteinase) is an enzyme. This enzyme catalyses the following chemical reaction

 Hydrolysis of proteins with specificity similar to that of pepsin A, but also cleaves Cys(SO3H)7-Gly and Leu17-Val in the B chain of insulin

This enzyme is isolated from the fungus Scytalidium lignicolum.

References

External links 
 

EC 3.4.23